Dharmasala is a Vidhan Sabha constituency of Jajpur district, Odisha.

Area of this constituency includes Dharmasala block and 9 GPs (Odiso, Kalana, Singhpur, Sribantapur, Jabara, Nathuabar, Rahamba, Barabati and Rasulpur) of Rasulpur block.

Elected Members

16 elections held during 1951 to 2019. Elected members from the Dharmasala constituency are:

2019: (51): Pranab Kumar Balabantaray (BJD)
2014: (51): Pranab Kumar Balabantaray (BJD)
2009: (51): Kalpataru Das (BJD)
2004: (26): Rajes Das (BJD) 
2000: (26): Kalpataru Das (BJD) 
1995: (26): Kalpataru Das (Janata Dal) 
1990: (26): Gurcharan Tikayat (Janata Dal) 
1985: (26): Kangali Charan Panda (Congress)
1980: (26): Kangali Charan Panda (Independent)
1977: (26): Rabi Das (Janata Party)
1974: (26): Banka Behari Das (Congress)
1971: (23): Banka Behari Das (Praja Socialist Party)
1967: (23): Paramananda Mohanty (Praja Socialist Party)
1961: (116): Gadadhar Dutta  (Congress)
1957: (83): Madan Mohan Patnayak (Congress) and Mayadhar Singh (Congress)
1951: (63): Paramananda Mohanty (Socialist Party)

2019 Election Result

2014 Election Result
In 2014 election, Biju Janata Dal candidate Pranab Kumar Balabantaray defeated Indian National Congress candidate Srinath Mishra by a margin of 85,786 votes.

Summary of results of the 2009 Election
In 2009 election, Biju Janata Dal candidate Kalpataru Das defeated Indian National Congress candidate Kangali Charan Panda by a margin of 35,133 votes.

Notes

References

Assembly constituencies of Odisha
Jajpur district